Simon Bennett (died between 1411 and 1417), was an English Member of Parliament.

He was a Member (MP) of the Parliament of England for Warwick in 1404.

References

14th-century births
1410s deaths
15th-century English people
People from Warwick
Members of the Parliament of England (pre-1707)